|}

The Acomb Stakes is a Group 3 flat horse race in Great Britain open to two-year-old horses. It is run at York over a distance of 7 furlongs (1,408 metres), and it is scheduled to take place each year in August.

The event is named after Acomb, an area of York located to the north-west of the racecourse. It was given Listed status in 1998, and promoted to Group 3 level in 2006. It is currently held on the opening day of the four-day Ebor Festival meeting.

The leading horses from the Acomb Stakes sometimes go on to compete in Group 1 races, and certain participants have been successful in the following year's Classics.

Records

Leading jockey since 1986  (4 wins):
 Pat Eddery – Bellotto (1986), Torrey Canyon (1991), Concordial (1993), Options Open (1994)
 Lester Piggott rode 6 winners of the race before 1986 - Royal Palace (1966), Dieudonne (1968), Billy Bremner (1971), Tanzor (1974),Padroug (1976) & Height of Fashion (1981)

Leading trainer since 1986 (4 wins):
 Sir Michael Stoute – Always Fair (1987), Aquatic (1989), King's Best (1999), Comfy (2001)
 Mark Johnston - Bijou d'Inde (1995), Bourbonnais (2002), Elliots World (2004), Gear Up (2020)

Winners since 1986

Earlier winners

 1948: Kiowa
 1949: Périgueux
 1950: Djebellica 
 1951: Alcinus
 1952: Aureole
 1953: L'Avengro
 1954: Acropolis
 1955: Mamounia
 1956: Snow Leopard
 1957: Cool Debate
 1958: Anthelion
 1959: Beau Ideal
 1960: Tender Word
 1961: Cyrus
 1962: Confidence
 1963: Causerie
 1964: Royalgo
 1965: Le Cordonnier
 1966: Royal Palace
 1967: Alaska Way
 1968: Dieudonne
 1969: Dubrava
 1970: Sir Lark
 1971: Billy Bremner
 1972: Kwang Su
 1973: Consolatrix
 1974: Tanzor
 1975: Mid Beat
 1976: Padroug
 1977: Tartan Pimpernel
 1978: Senorita Poquito
 1979: Rontino
 1980: Cocaine
 1981: Height of Fashion
 1982: Gorytus
 1983: Elusive
 1984: Kohaylan
 1985: Native Wizard

See also
 Horse racing in Great Britain
 List of British flat horse races

References
 Paris-Turf: 
 Racing Post:
 galopp-sieger.de – Acomb Stakes.
 ifhaonline.org – International Federation of Horseracing Authorities – Acomb Stakes (2019).
 pedigreequery.com – Acomb Stakes – York.

Flat races in Great Britain
York Racecourse
Flat horse races for two-year-olds